The following is a list of independent pharmaceutical, biotechnology and medical companies listed on a stock exchange (as indicated) that have generated a revenue of at least , ranked by their revenue in the respective financial year.

It does not include biotechnology companies that are now owned by, or form a part of, larger pharmaceutical groups.

Ranking by Revenue 
The following table lists the largest biotechnology and pharmaceutical companies ranked by revenue in billion USD. The change column indicates the company's relative position in this list compared to its relative position in the preceding year; i.e., an increase would be moving closer to rank 1 and vice versa. Green cells indicate years where revenue increased compared to the preceding year. Red cells indicate those years where there has been a decrease.

See also
List of largest biomedical companies by market capitalization

References

 
Biotechnology